Ambaguio, officially the Municipality of Ambaguio, is a 5th class municipality in the province of Nueva Vizcaya, Philippines. According to the 2020 census, it has a population of 15,472 people.

Etymology
The name "ambaguio" was from the word "bagiw," meaning "moss" which covered every inch of trees and stones in the area. The inhabitants were called "e-am-bagiw" meaning "conqueror of moss." 
The name underwent a series of changes due to its difficult pronunciation by the lowland people who later settled in the area, resulting in the present "Ambaguio."

History
A handful of settlers headed by Fausto Tagangtang who came from the neighboring Mountain Province pioneered and disturbed the tranquility of the place transforming the wilderness into growing prosperous farm hills and rice terraces.

Due to its terrain, distance and road problems, the inhabitants composed only of three major tribes: Igorot, Ifugao, and Ibaloi, who came to the place for refuge for a better living, shelter and justice and were united under the leadership of Fausto Tagangtang. The inhabitants, by way of a unanimous decision, called the place “Ambaguio”, which means “the land of mosses”, and “its climate is similar to that of Baguio”.

Before its creation as a municipality, Ambaguio was then a barrio of the Municipality of Bayombong.  Leonardo B. Perez, then Congressman of Nueva Vizcaya, authored the bill seeking for the creation of Ambaguio as an independent municipality. The bill was approved on 18 June 1966 by virtue of Republic Act. No. 4735. In the same year, Mr. Mariano L. Agnahe, the then Incumbent Barrio Lieutenant, was appointed as the first mayor of the town.

Geography

Barangays
Ambaguio is politically subdivided into 8 barangays. These barangays are headed by elected officials: Barangay Captain, Barangay Council, whose members are called Barangay Councilors. All are elected every three years.

 Ammoweg
 Camandag
 Labang
 Napo
 Poblacion
 Salingsingan
 Tiblac
 Dulli

Climate

Demographics

Economy

Government
Ambaguio, belonging to the lone congressional district of the province of Nueva Vizcaya, is governed by a mayor designated as its local chief executive and by a municipal council as its legislative body in accordance with the Local Government Code. The mayor, vice mayor, and the councilors are elected directly by the people through an election which is being held every three years.

Elected officials

Education
The Schools Division of Nueva Vizcaya governs the town's public education system. The division office is a field office of the DepEd in Cagayan Valley region. The office governs the public and private elementary and public and private high schools throughout the municipality.

References

External links
[ Philippine Standard Geographic Code]
Philippine Census Information
Local Governance Performance Management System

Municipalities of Nueva Vizcaya